Oscar Broady (May 28, 1832 – March 13, 1922) was a petty officer in the Swedish navy who emigrated to the United States. During the Civil War he rose to the command of a brigade in the Union Army. After returning to Sweden as a Baptist missionary, he became the first president of the Swedish Baptist Bethel Seminary.

Early life
Broady was born in Uppsala, the son of a niterworker, went to school in Stockholm, and began clerking in a store at the age of 13. At age 16 he enlisted in the Swedish navy, becoming a petty officer in 1852, and married the same year. Two years later he and his wife decided to emigrate to the United States, but his wife died at sea. In New York Broady became a convinced Baptist, and enrolled at Madison University in New York State, today's Colgate University, where he pursued his studies at the same time as preaching to a local Baptist congregation. Broady graduated with a B.A. in 1861, and entered into his second marriage shortly thereafter.

Civil War
When the American Civil War began, the students at Madison University raised a volunteer company, and offered it to United States service. In September 1861 the company became Company C, 61st New York Volunteer Infantry Regiment, and Broady became its captain. A year later Broady was promoted to lieutenant colonel, and in the spring of 1863 he became, as lieutenant colonel, commanding officer of the regiment. In the summer of 1864 Broady became, still a lieutenant colonel, a brigade commander in the Army of the Potomac. A month later he was wounded in action at the Second Battle of Ream's Station, and had to leave his command. He was subsequently mustered out of United States, outside of Petersburg, Virginia. In 1865 Broady was brevetted colonel, United States Volunteers.

Baptist pioneer
In 1866 Broady returned to Sweden, under his American name, as a missionary in the service of the American Baptist Foreign Mission Society of Boston. In Sweden he became the first president of the Swedish Baptist Bethel Seminary, a predecessor of the Stockholm School of Theology, a position he held until 1906. Broady held a number of positions of trust in the Swedish Baptist movement, and was an avid temperance advocate. In 1877 Madison University honored him with the degree of Doctor of Divinity, and in 1916 the degree of Legum Doctor was conferred of him by its successor, the Colgate University.

See also 
 John Alexis Edgren – contemporaneous Swedish Baptist missionary
 Gustaf Palmquist – contemporaneous Swedish Baptist missionary
 Anders Wiberg – contemporaneous Swedish Baptist missionary

References

People from Uppsala
Swedish emigrants to the United States
United States Army officers
19th-century Baptist ministers from the United States
Baptist missionaries from the United States
Rectors of universities and colleges in Sweden
Union Army officers
People of Sweden in the American Civil War
Baptist missionaries in Europe
Protestant missionaries in Sweden
Swedish Baptist missionaries
1832 births
1922 deaths
Swedish Navy personnel
Burials at Norra begravningsplatsen
20th-century Baptist ministers
Swedish temperance activists